Noree Jockygym, or another name Khongdee Meekhunapparp (ของดี มีคุณภาพ), is a retired Thai professional boxer who held the WBF Junior lightweight world champion in 1990s.

Biography and career
Jockygym was born at Tambon Nam Kham Yai, Amphoe Yasothon  (currently Yasothon province), Ubon Ratchathani province. He loves to boxing since childhood his father took him to a boxing gym "Jocky Gym" in Bangkok's Rama VI Road neighbourhood by Sommart Hongsakul as an owner, trainer, and manager. He ever lost-won with Daorung Chuvatana and a boxing partner for famed Samart Payakaroon and Khaosai Galaxy. At the age of 18, he won Rajadamnern Stadium Junior featherweight champion (comparable to Thailand champion).

He became a rising star when he defeated Naoto Takahashi, a Japanese boxer on February 11, 1990 at Tokyo Dome, Tokyo, Japan on the undercard of Mike Tyson vs. James "Buster" Douglas and won five times in Thailand,  he was supported for challenge WBA Junior featherweight world champion with Colombian boxer, Luis Enrique Mendoza on January 20, 1991 at Pantip Plaza, Pratunam, Bangkok but he was knockout in the ninth round. After that, his boxing stats aren't good at all, has lost and won alternately. Later, he was a boxing partner for Saen Sor Ploenchit a rising boxer at that time, because he was a heavier weight class boxer.

In 1997, he changed his manager to Song Kanchanachoosak, a Thai Chinese businessman who had a boxing gym in Yaowarat neighbourhood and renamed to "Khongdee Meekhunapparp". Meekhunapparp challenge the minor institution WBF Junior lightweight world champion with Shawn Simmons, an American boxer at Central Plaza Pinklao, Bangkok Noi District, Bangkok on May 23, 1997 the result is he won by knockout in the fifth round. During this time, he began to return a fame and money until he ignored his wife, she finally divorces him, and he was strip of the WBF title in early 2000. His final fight he was knockout with fellow-countryman Kularbdang Kiatkrerin in the third round on November 10, 2001.

After retirement
After retirement he was arrested by the police for drugs and trafficking in Ya ba (tablets of methamphetamine and caffeine popular in Thailand) in 2001. He was sentenced to three years and six months in prison.

He is now a homeless person. He lives in the Ratchawong Pier, Yaowarat, where he makes a living by helping the tourists and keeping the safety of those who use the Chao Phraya Express Boat. These people will repay him with a small amount of money. Although his relatives persuades him back to his native, he don't go because he was binding to the pier because of the site of his boxing gym in the past.

References

External links
 

1970 births
Living people
Super-featherweight boxers
Super-bantamweight boxers
Noree Jockygym
Noree Jockygym